Nocardioides terrigena is a Gram-positive bacterium from the genus Nocardioides which has been isolated from soil from Dokdo, Korea.

References

External links
Type strain of Nocardioides terrigena at BacDive -  the Bacterial Diversity Metadatabase	

terrigena
Bacteria described in 2007